Statistics of Denmark Tournament in the 1928/1929 season.

Overview
It was contested by 25 teams, and Boldklubben af 1893 won the championship.

First phase

Series 1

Series 2

Series 3

Series 4

Series 5

Second phase

References
Denmark – List of final tables (RSSSF)

1928-29
Dan
1928–29 in Danish football